Cologno Nord is a suburban station on Line 2 of the Milan Metro in the municipality of Cologno Monzese.

History
The station was opened 7 June 1981 with the opening of the Cologno Monzese branch from Cascina Gobba. Between 9 July 2010 and 18 December 2011 the station was renovated. In particular, there have been improvements in the signs and four elevators installed. In general, the station was adapted for people with disabilities during that renovation.  The project cost was about €1.7 million, and was fully funded by the Province of Milan.

References

Line 2 (Milan Metro) stations
Railway stations opened in 1981
1981 establishments in Italy
Railway stations in Italy opened in the 20th century